Yannick Vaugrenard (born 25 June 1950 in Trignac, Loire-Atlantique) is a French politician and Member of the European Parliament for the west of France. He is a member of the Socialist Party, which is part of the Party of European Socialists, and sits on the European Parliament's Committee on Budgets.

He is also a substitute for the Committee on Employment and Social Affairs, a member of the delegation to the EU–Romania Joint Parliamentary Committee, and a substitute for the delegation to the EU–Bulgaria Joint Parliamentary Committee.

Career
 Baccalauréat
 Worked at the Banque nationale de Paris (1972–1989)
 Special adviser to the Deputy Mayor of Nantes (1989–2004)
 First federal secretary, Loire-Atlantique Socialist Party (1990–2001)
 Deputy mayor of Trignac (1977–1989)
 Deputy mayor of Saint-Nazaire (1995–2001)
 Member of the Loire-Atlantique Departmental Council (1982–1994)
 Member of the Pays de la Loire Regional Council (1986–2004)
 First Vice-Chairman of the Pays de la Loire Regional Council (since 2004)

External links
 Official website (in French)
 European Parliament biography
 Declaration of financial interests (in French; PDF file)

1950 births
Living people
MEPs for West France 2004–2009
Socialist Party (France) MEPs
Senators of Loire-Atlantique
French Senators of the Fifth Republic
Politicians from Pays de la Loire